Cameron Diaz is an American actress who has appeared in over 40 films throughout the course of her career, which spans over two decades. Originally a model, Diaz made her film debut in the comedy The Mask (1994). Followed by supporting roles in several independent films and comedies, such as My Best Friend's Wedding (1997), she has the starring role of Mary in the hit comedy There's Something About Mary (1998), which earned her a Golden Globe Award nomination for Best Lead Actress in a Comedy or Musical. She was subsequently cast in Spike Jonze's surrealist fantasy film Being John Malkovich (1999), which earned her a second Golden Globe nomination, and in Oliver Stone's sports drama Any Given Sunday (1999). 

Diaz would continue appearing in high-profile films in the early-2000s such as Charlie's Angels (2000) and its sequel, Charlie's Angels: Full Throttle (2003), as well as voicing Princess Fiona in the Shrek franchise (2001–2010). She would gain two additional Golden Globe Award nominations for Best Supporting Actress for her roles in Cameron Crowe's Vanilla Sky (2001) and Martin Scorsese's period film Gangs of New York (2002).

In the late-2000s and early-2010s, Diaz continued to star in numerous comedies such as What Happens in Vegas (2008), Bad Teacher (2011), and What to Expect When You're Expecting (2012). She also starred in the psychological horror film The Box (2009) and the big-budget action film The Green Hornet (2011). Diaz had a supporting role in Ridley Scott's crime thriller The Counselor (2013), followed by a lead role in the comedy Sex Tape (2014) and the musical-comedy Annie (2014), an adaptation of the Broadway musical of the same name. After her appearance in Annie, Diaz announced in 2018 that she had formally retired from acting. In 2022, she came out of retirement to join the Netflix action-comedy, Back in Action.

Film

Television

Video games

Theme parks

See also
List of awards and nominations received by Cameron Diaz

References

Cameron Diaz
Diaz, Cameron
American filmographies